Roy A. Clifford (June 14, 1900 – June 12, 1996) was the 2nd head coach of the Cleveland Rebels.

Clifford grew up in Lansing, Michigan graduating from Western Michigan University, known then as Western State Normal School, in 1924.   That September he became the head basketball coach at Collinwood High School in Cleveland, coaching from 1924–1928.  His 1928 Collinwood team had a perfect, undefeated season of 14–0.  Clifford also coached the high school varsity soccer teams during this era.

From 1929–1946 Clifford was the head basketball coach at Western Reserve University (now Case Western Reserve University) and was inducted into their hall of fame in 1981.

During the 1946–47 BAA season, Clifford assumed the role as head coach of the Cleveland Rebels on February 12, 1947 after the resignation of Dutch Dehnert. Clifford led the team into the playoffs. The franchise folded after just one season.

References

1900 births
1996 deaths
Basketball coaches from Michigan
Basketball players from Michigan
Case Western Spartans men's basketball coaches
Cleveland Rebels coaches
College men's basketball head coaches in the United States
American men's basketball players